Krąg may refer to the following places:
Krąg, Kuyavian-Pomeranian Voivodeship (north-central Poland)
Krąg, Pomeranian Voivodeship (north Poland)
Krąg, West Pomeranian Voivodeship (north-west Poland)

See also
Krag (disambiguation)